Connithorax is a monotypic genus of Asian dwarf spiders containing the single species, Connithorax barbatus. It was first described by K. Y. Eskov in 1993, and has only been found in Russia.

See also
 List of Linyphiidae species

References

Linyphiidae
Monotypic Araneomorphae genera
Spiders of Russia